Edward Thiele was a rear admiral in the United States Coast Guard.

Biography
Thiele was born on September 4, 1905, in Washington, D.C. He graduated from McKinley Technology High School. Thiele died in 1981.

Career
Thiele was originally a member of the District of Columbia National Guard, serving with the 121st Engineer Battalion. He was honorably discharged in 1924 and entered the United States Coast Guard Academy, graduating in 1927.

From 1930 to 1933, Thiele was an instructor at the School of Instruction. Additionally, he was coach of the swimming team.

Awards Thiele received for his service in the war include the American Defense Service Medal, the World War II Victory Medal, the Navy Occupation Service Medal and the Philippine Defense Medal.

Thiele's later assignment included serving in London, England and as Engineer-in-Chief of the Coast Guard. He retired from the Coast Guard in 1961.

References

People from Washington, D.C.
United States Coast Guard admirals
United States Army soldiers
United States Coast Guard Academy alumni
American swimming coaches
1905 births
1981 deaths
United States Coast Guard personnel of World War II
American expatriates in the United Kingdom